Cura sa čaršije is the tenth studio album by Bosnian pop-folk singer Elvira Rahić. It was released 11 April 2011 through Hayat Production.

Background
Rahić recorded a duet with friend and colleague Enes Begović called "Dođi na godinu" for the album. A "new style" accompanied the album, different from Rahić's previous work.

Release
Cura sa čaršije was released by Hayat Production on 11 April 2011. A "promotional party" was held at Sarajevo's hotel Bristol 30 May 2011. Also the help promote Cura sa čaršije, Rahić embarked on a tour of the same name.

Track listing

Personnel

Instruments

Igor Gregurić – accordion
Kenan Dedić – accordion, piano
Demira Pašalić – backing vocals
Elma Selimović – backing vocals
Mensura Bajraktarević – backing vocals
Mirko Šenkovski "Geronimo" – backing vocals
Edvin Hodžić – bass guitar
Muris Hubjer – drums
Almir Hukelić – guitar
Muris Varajić – guitar
Vernes Ljuštaku – guitar

Production and recording
Marin Meštrović – mixing, mastering

Crew
Ado Karišik – styling (make-up, hair)
Jasmin Fazlagić – photography

References

External links
Cura sa čaršije at Discogs

2011 albums
Elvira Rahić albums
Hayat Production albums